United Nations Security Council resolution 1340, adopted unanimously on 8 February 2001, after recalling resolutions   808 (1993), 827 (1993), 1166 (1998) and 1329 (2000), the Council forwarded a list of nominees for permanent judges at the International Criminal Tribunal for the former Yugoslavia (ICTY) to the General Assembly for consideration.

The list of nominees proposed by the Secretary-General Kofi Annan was as follows:

 Carmel A. Agius (Malta)
 Richard Banda (Malawi)
 Mohamed Amin El Abbassi Elmahdi (Egypt)
 David Hunt (Australia)
 Claude Jorda (France)
 O-Gon Kwon (South Korea)
 Liu Daqun (China)
 Abderraouf Mahbouli (Tunisia)
 Richard May (United Kingdom)
 Theodor Meron (United States)
 Florence Ndepele Mwachande Mumba (Zambia)
 Rafael Nieto Navia (Colombia)
 Leopold Ntahompagaze (Burundi)
 Alphonsus Martinus Maria Orie (Netherlands)
 Fausto Pocar (Italy)
 Jonah Rahetlah (Madagascar)
 Patrick Lipton Robinson (Jamaica)
 Almiro Simões Rodrigues (Portugal)
 Miriam Defensor Santiago (Philippines)
 Wolfgang Schomburg (Germany)
 Mohamed Shahabuddeen (Guyana)
 Demetrakis Stylianides (Cyprus)
 Krister Thelin (Sweden)
 Volodymyr Vassylenko (Ukraine)
 Karam Chand Vohrah (Malaysia)

See also
 List of United Nations Security Council Resolutions 1301 to 1400 (2000–2002)
 Yugoslav Wars

References

External links
 
Text of the Resolution at undocs.org

 1340
2001 in Yugoslavia
 1340
February 2001 events